Vlatko Vedral  is a Serbian-born (and naturalised British citizen) physicist and Professor in the Department of Physics at the University of Oxford and a Fellow of Wolfson College, Oxford.  Until the summer of 2022 he also held a joint appointment at the Centre for Quantum Technologies (CQT) at the National University of Singapore. He is known for his research on the theory of quantum entanglement and quantum information theory.  He has published numerous research papers, which are regularly cited, in quantum mechanics and quantum information, and was awarded the Royal Society Wolfson Research Merit Award in 2007. He has held a lectureship and readership at Imperial College, a professorship at Leeds and visiting professorships in Vienna, Singapore (NUS) and at the Perimeter Institute for Theoretical Physics in Canada.  He is the author of several books, including Decoding Reality.

Education
After completing secondary education at Mathematical Grammar School (Matematička gimnazija), he received his Bachelor of Science and Doctor of Philosophy degrees from Imperial College London, where he graduated with a PhD in 1998.

Career and research
After his PhD, Vedral was appointed Elsag-Bailey postdoctoral research fellow in Oxford. He then held a research fellowship at Merton College, Oxford returning to Imperial College as the Governor’s lecturer to start a quantum information science research group, a position he held from 2000-2004. Before returning to Oxford, he was centenary professor of quantum information science at the University of Leeds from 2004 to 2009. As of 2009, he has held joint appointments as a Professor of Physics at the University of Oxford and the Centre for Quantum Technologies (CQT) at the National University of Singapore, the latter ending in the summer of 2022. He was appointed Fellow of Wolfson College, Oxford in 2009.

Publications
Vedral's publications can all be found on Google Scholar. His books include:

 2005: Modern Foundations of Quantum Optics
 2006:Introduction to Quantum Information Science
 2010: Introductory Quantum Physics and Relativity
 2010: Decoding Reality: The Universe as Quantum Information
 2018: Solid State Quantum Information
 2018:From Micro to Macro: Adventures of a Wandering Physicist

Awards and honours
 Royal Society Wolfson Research Merit Award, 2007.
 The World Scientific Physics Research Medal, 2009
 Recipient of Marko V. Jaric Award, 2011
 Elected a Fellow of the Institute of Physics (FInstP) in 2017
 Elected a member of The Academia Europaea, which known also as The Academy of Europe in 2020

References

External links
Website
Substack
"Forum discussion on BBC World Services"
"BBC Radio 4 Talk on the Material World"
"Vlatko Vedral: 'I'd like to explain the origin of God' Interview with the Observer"
"Quantum thermodynamics in New Scientist"

Living people
Fellows of Wolfson College, Oxford
Serbian physicists
British physicists
Serbian emigrants to the United Kingdom
Fellows of Merton College, Oxford
Fellows of the Institute of Physics
1971 births